Prison Saint-Paul, also named Prison Saint-Paul - Saint Joseph was the maison d'arrêt of Lyon, France, located in the Confluence quarter, 2nd arrondissement of Lyon, in the south of the Gare de Lyon-Perrache. It was so named because of its proximity to the Palais de Justice and its address is 33 cours Suchet. The building, being too old, is now the subject of new projects. All prisoners have been moved to the new prison of Corbas.

History
In 1847, the decision was made to construct a facility that could house 550 prisoners divided into 7 districts. Built in under the direction of the architect Louis-Pierre Baltard, its plans were previously drawn by Antonin Louvier on 14 February 1860, later approved by the General Council of the buildings on 7 April of the same year. The location was chosen in 1859 by the prefect of the Rhône Claude-Marius Vaïsse and approved by the Conseil Général du Rhône. In 1984, a scheduled expansion of the prison on the street Delandine was rejected by the mayor.

In February 2009, a suicide in the prison was recounted in the media. A song written by Lyon group named My Dragon, entitled "Les Cafards", criticizes the prison overcrowding.

The walls were made of rubble from Couzon and Saint-Martin.

On 3 May 2009, all the prisoners were transferred to the new establishment, located in Corbas.

After the removal of prisoners, the future of the buildings remains uncertain. Located in the center of the Confluence quarter, the prisons are the subject of multiple projects, but are threatened with destruction. In March, 2009, an association militated in favour of the protection of the buildings, deeming they had a high patrimonial value, and therefore proposed until 31 December 2009 to sign a petition to fight against their destruction.

Photos

References

2nd arrondissement of Lyon
Prisons in Lyon
Defunct prisons in France
2009 disestablishments in France